Anthony Simmons is the name of:

 Anthony Simmons (writer) (1922–2016), British writer and film director
 Anthony Simmons (American football) (born 1976), former NFL linebacker
 Anthony Simmons, called Tony Simmons (athlete) (born 1948), Welsh and English athlete

See also
Tony Simmons (disambiguation)
Anfernee Simons (born 1999), American basketball player